Beneath the Surface is the third solo studio album by  American hip hop musician and Wu-Tang Clan member GZA. The album was released on June 29, 1999, by MCA Records.

Track listing

Personnel
 Arabian Knight - Producer, Engineer, Executive Producer, Assistant Engineer, Mixing, Mixing Assistant
 Dragan "Chach" Cacinovic - Engineer
 Tom Coyne - Mastering
 Joan Davis - Performer
 GZA - Producer, Executive Producer
 Inspectah Deck - Producer
 John the Baptist - Producer
 Killah Priest - Vocals
 La the Darkman - Vocals
 Masta Killa - Vocals
 Mathematics - Producer
 Method Man - Vocals
 Hell Razah - Vocals
 Ol' Dirty Bastard - Performer
 RZA - Vocals, Executive Producer
 Trigga - Performer

Charts

Weekly charts

Year-end charts

See also
 List of number-one R&B albums of 1999 (U.S.)

References

1999 albums
GZA albums
MCA Records albums
Albums produced by RZA